The 2022 Chinese Artistic Gymnastics Championships were held from September 4–9, 2022 in Hangzhou, Zhejiang.

Women's medalists

Men's medalists

References

Chinese Artistic Gymnastics Championships
2022 in Chinese sport
Chinese Artistic Gymnastics Championships